Emma Klingenberg (born 1992) is a Danish orienteering competitor, and junior World champion.

Early life
Klingenberg has done orienteering since she was seven years old. Before 2008 she participated in the European Youth Orienteering Championships. Her club is OK Pan Århus and she is from the southern part of Denmark.

Junior career
Emma Klingenberg became Junior World Champion in sprint in Gothenburg in 2008, before Silje Ekroll Jahren and Jenny Lönnkvist, with less than three seconds between winner and third place. She was the youngest person to ever win a junior world orienteering championship, at the age of 16.

The junior world championship, and Klingenberg's victory in the sprint event, has been covered or referred to in news magazines and sports magazines worldwide. Danish newspapers had more in-depth presentations of the winner.

Klingenberg went on to win two more gold medals as a junior, both in the Relay. She became a senior after the 2012 Junior World Championships.

Senior career
two years after becoming a senior, Klingenberg won her first medal in the 2014 World Orienteering Championships in Italy. In 2015, the Danish women's team won 4 of the 5 gold medals at the championships in Inverness. Emma was a member of both relay teams, bringing back two gold medals.

To date, Klingenberg has not won any individual gold medals at a senior championship.

See also
 Danish orienteers
 List of orienteers
 List of orienteering events

References

External links

1992 births
Living people
Danish orienteers
Female orienteers
Foot orienteers
World Orienteering Championships medalists
Junior World Orienteering Championships medalists